National Highway 943, commonly referred to as NH 943 is a national highway in  India. It is a spur road of National Highway 43. NH-943 traverses the state of Madhya Pradesh in India.

Route 

Pawai - Saleha - (Jaso) Jassu - Nagod.

Junctions  
 
  Terminal near Pawai.
  Terminal near Nagod.

See also 

 List of National Highways in India
 List of National Highways in India by state

References

External links 
 
 NH 943 on OpenStreetMap

National highways in India
National Highways in Madhya Pradesh